Red Level may refer to any of five places in the United States:

Red Level, Chambers County, Alabama
Red Level, Covington County, Alabama
Red Level, Montgomery County, Alabama
Red Level, Florida
Red Level, Texas